The 2007–08 season is the 53rd season of Pakistan domestic football and the 4th season of the Pakistan Premier League and was held from November 1, 2007 to February 6, 2008 under the auspices of Pakistan Football Federation.

Changes
Recently, the Pakistan Football Federation made changes to the league. It was announced that the league has been increased to a total of 14 teams with Habib Bank Limited, which was relegated after a winning 2 and drawing 6 out of 20 games in previous season, has also been given permission to field its team. Similarly, Pakistan Airlines, which had withdrawn its entry from the last year edition at the eleventh hour, will also feature in the coming event.

Format
A total of 182 matches will be played at different venues in Islamabad, Lahore, Karachi, Rawalpindi, Chaman, and Faisalabad. Peshawar, which was also under consideration to host few matches, has been left out of the venues’ list due to financial constraints. In Karachi, 65 matches would be held, Lahore and Islamabad have got 39 matches each, while Rawalpindi, Chaman and Faisalabad will host 13 matches each.

The winners will represent Pakistan at the 2008 AFC President's Cup. The bottom two teams will be relegated to the Pakistan Football Federation League and two teams (winners and runners-up) from Pakistan Football Federation League will be promoted for the 2008-09 edition..

The matches will be held at 13:00 PST and 15:00 PST respectively on home and away basis.

This season the winning prize will be Rs. 500,000, the runners-up team will receive Rs 300,000 while the third position holder will receive Rs 100,000. All matches are likely to be supervised by neutral referees.

Teams

Stadia and locations

Season summary
The league title went to the final day of the season, with a match between Pakistan Army and WAPDA, with Army only needing a draw to retain their title, however WAPDA went on to win the match 2-1 after two goals from Arif Mehmood completing the comeback after being 0-1 down by a goal from Imran Hussain.

WAPDA won their second Premier League title and sixth top division title and became the first team to end a season undefeated.

Wohaib and Pakistan Railways were relegated to the PFF League and will be replaced next season by PFF League winners Pak Elektron and runner-ups Pakistan Steel.

Final standings

Season statistics

Scoring
Fastest goal in a match: 43 seconds – Essa for Khan Research Laboratories against Habib Bank (12 December 2007)
First hat-trick of the season: Adeel Ahmed for Khan Research Laboratories against Pakistan Television (19 November 2007)
Widest winning margin: 6 goals – WAPDA 7–1 Wohaib (5 January 2008)
Most hat-tricks scored by one player: 2
Arif Mehmood for WAPDA
WAPDA 7–1 Wohaib (5 January 2008)
WAPDA 4–0 Habib Bank (13 January 2008)
Most hat-tricks by a team: 3
Khan Research Laboratories
Adeel Ahmed v Pakistan Television (19 November 2007)
Muhammad Rasool v National Bank (26 December 2007)
Yasir Afridi v Afghan Chaman (15 January 2008)
WAPDA
Arif Mehmood v Habib Bank (13 January 2008)
Zulfiqar Ali Shah v Wohaib (5 January 2008)
Arif Mehmood v Wohaib (5 January 2008)
This is the first time in the Premier League that two players has scored a hat-trick in a single match.
Team with most goals scored: 64 goals – WAPDA
Team with fewest goals scored: 11 goals – Wohaib
Team with fewest goals conceded: 10 goals – Pakistan Army
Team with most goals conceded: 57 goals – Wohaib

Top scorers

Hat-tricks

4 Player scored four goals

External links
Pakistan Football Federation
PFF announces changes to Premier League - The News
More changes in League - The News
WAPDA down Army 2-1 to clinch title

Pakistan Premier League seasons
1
Pakistan